Behrends is a German surname.  It is a variant of Behrendt.  Notable people with the surname include:

Heinrich Behrends (1916–2002), German military officer during World War II
Hermann Behrends (1907–1948), German Nazi SS officer executed for war crimes
Jan C. Behrends (born 1969), German historian
Leffmann Behrends (1630–1714), German financial agent

See also
Behrend (disambiguation)

German-language surnames